The 1510s decade ran from January 1, 1510, to December 31, 1519.

References